Various Salafist states appeared during Afghanistan's war with the Soviets and following period of civil war. The Salafist ideology was disseminated in Afghanistan by Saudi supporters of the Afghan resistance, who required ideological conformity from the Afghans in exchange for aid.

Salafist mini-states
Several prominent men among the Salafist converts returned to Afghanistan and formed small localised states with fellow Afghan Salafists, often again with the aid of foreign backers.
 In Nuristan province, Mawlawi Afzal formed the Islamic Revolutionary State of Afghanistan
 In Kunar province, Jamil al-Rahman, a former Hezb-e-Islami Gulbuddin member, broke off from his party and formed the Islamic Emirate of Kunar ruled by his new organisation Jamaat al-Dawah ila al-Quran wal-Sunnah.
 In Badakhshan province, Mawlawi Shariqi formed a Salafist emirate

Sources
 Ed Darack. Victory Point: Operations Red Wings and Whalers – The Marine Corps' Battle for Freedom in Afghanistan. Penguin Group, 2009. , .
 Olivier Roy, Carol Volk. The Failure of Political Islam. Harvard University Press, 1996. , .

References

Salafist states in Afghanistan